Oriol Salvia (born 29 March 1975 in Barcelona) is a professional squash player from Spain.

PSA Tour Titles

PSA Tour Finals (Runner-Up)

External links 
 
 Profile at psa-squash.com

Spanish male squash players
1975 births
Living people